The list of presidents of the Legislative Assembly of the Azores consists of the chairpersons for the autonomous local legislature of the Azores, since the Carnation Revolution that installed the democratic Third Portuguese Republic. This list includes the leaders of the transitional regimes and those presidents elected after the institutionalization of the autonomy statute that provided archipelago with its laws and democratic rights.

On 21 July 1976, Álvaro Monjardino was elected by plenum of the Regional Assembly, the first President of the Azorean Assembly, nominated by the first President of the Azores (João Bosco Mota Amaral).

Presidents

The numbering reflects the uninterrupted terms in office served by each president.

The current President of the Government of the Azores is  Ana Luís, whose party won the Azorean regional election on 14 October 2012, and was nominated by President Vasco Cordeiro for the position.

The colors indicate the political affiliation of each President.

Timeline

References
Notes

Sources